Yavuzeli is a municipality (belde) of Gaziantep Province of Turkey. It had a population of 4,287 in 2021.

References

Populated places in Gaziantep Province
Yavuzeli District